Max Castillo was the fourth president of the University of Houston–Downtown (UHD) from 1992 to 2009.  He has served as the longest president of UHD as of his retirement date on July 31, 2009.  Castillo holds a Bachelor of Arts and Master of Arts from St. Mary's University, and a Doctor of Education from the University of Houston.  Prior to becoming president of UHD, he served as president of San Antonio College from 1982 to 1992.

References

External links
 UHD Biography

Presidents of the University of Houston–Downtown
University of Houston alumni

St. Mary's University, Texas alumni

Living people

Year of birth missing (living people)
Place of birth missing (living people)